The Bender Mountains are a small group of mountains  southwest of the Berry Peaks, between the southeast edge of the Ross Ice Shelf and the Watson Escarpment. They were mapped by the United States Geological Survey from ground surveys and from U.S. Navy air photos, 1960–63, and named by the Advisory Committee on Antarctic Names for Lieutenant Commander Leslie C. Bender, U.S. Navy, an aircraft commander at McMurdo Station, 1962–63 and 1963–64.

References 

Mountain ranges of Marie Byrd Land